Rock & Chips is a British television comedy-drama miniseries and a prequel to the sitcom Only Fools and Horses. The show is set in Peckham, southeast London, during the early 1960s, focusing primarily on the lives of Del Trotter, Freddie Robdal and Joan and Reg Trotter. Nicholas Lyndhurst, who played Rodney in Only Fools and Horses, plays Robdal alongside James Buckley (Del Boy), Kellie Bright (Joan), Shaun Dingwall (Reg) and Phil Daniels (Grandad). The Shazam Productions and BBC co-production was written by Only Fools and Horses creator John Sullivan, directed by Dewi Humphreys and produced by Gareth Gwenlan.

The 90-minute pilot was conceived in 1996 and commissioned in 2003, with the premise established in the final episode of Only Fools and Horses in 2003. It was shelved and Only Fools and Horses spin-off The Green Green Grass was developed; its success led to the prequel being recommissioned in July 2009. Filming began in October in London and the production was first broadcast on BBC One and BBC HD on 24 January 2010. It was the second most watched programme of the day but gained mixed reviews from critics.

Plot
The story starts in February 1960, by setting up the characters. Joan Trotter (Kellie Bright) is in an unhappy marriage with the lazy Reg (Shaun Dingwall), whose father Ted (Phil Daniels) has just moved in. Her 15-year-old son Derek, often shortened to Del Boy, (James Buckley) and his friends Boycie, Trigger, Jumbo Mills, Denzil (Stephen Lloyd, Lewis Osborne, Lee Long and Ashley Gerlach) are still in school, following an increase in the school-leaving age. Joan works at the local cinema with Trigger's aunt Reenie Turpin (Emma Cooke) and Raymond (Billy Seymour) for cinema manager Ernie Rayner (Robert Daws), and at the Town Hall as "a part-time filing clerk who sometimes makes the tea". Convicted thief Freddie Robdal (Nicholas Lyndhurst) has just been released from Dartmoor Prison and returned to Peckham with explosives expert Gerald "Jelly" Kelly (Paul Putner).

At the Town Hall, Joan asks Mr Johnson (Colin Prockter) about applying for a flat in the new high-rise estate; she is told she is unlikely to get a tenancy, as preference will be given to those with young children. At the Nag's Head, Freddie and Reg meet, and Reg invites him to his house to continue drinking. After meeting Joan and buying her a drink, Freddie realises that she is a Trotter, a family he has a dislike for. After they return to the Trotters' house, Freddie shows his affection for Joan.

At the cinema, Joan is promoted to part-time assistant manager and Rayner tells her that the safe sometimes contains over £2,000 at weekends. She later tells Freddie, after he goes round to her house to offer Reg some work (Reg was not at home as Freddie told him to meet him at the pub). They talk about art, and he invites her (and Reg) to his house-warming party.

In March, Joan has a Marilyn Monroe hairstyle and the safe at the cinema is broken into. Ahead of the party, Freddie gives Reg the use of his car, to return unused decorating materials to Guildford and he takes his father, Reenie and her boyfriend Clayton Cooper (Roger Griffiths) with him. They run out of petrol on the way, leaving Freddie and Joan the only ones at the party. They dance, and Freddie admits that he wanted to be alone with Joan so they could talk about art. They end the night by sleeping together.

In June, Reenie accompanies Joan to a pregnancy testing clinic, while the boys are on the Jolly Boys Outing to Margate (providing Freddie and Jelly the opportunity to burgle a jewellers). On their journey home, Reenie tells Joan about Freddie's time in prison and she realises he burgled the cinema. After Freddie tells Kelly he thinks he's in love with Joan, Reg announces her pregnancy in the pub. While Joan is completing a housing request form, Freddie goes to see her and she fails to acknowledge the baby is his.

The Trotters' housing application is successful in August, and September sees them view a flat in the new Sir Walter Raleigh House, which they have moved into in October. In November, Joan has her baby, which she calls Rodney (after the "handsome actor" Rod Taylor, and to the surprise of everyone else). The closing scene sees Joan enter the balcony of her flat with Rodney in her arms. After telling him that Del will be very rich one day, Joan sees Freddie on a balcony in a tower opposite; she shows him Rodney and nods her head, to his delight.

Throughout, the story tells of Del's strained relationship with his father and his affection for his mother; Reg's affair with the barmaid at the Nag's Head; Del and Jumbo selling goods from the docks out of the back of a van; Del and Boycie's attempt at dating Pam and Glenda (Jodie Mooney and Katie Griffiths); Joan fending off advances from her perverted boss and provides an introduction to Roy Slater (Calum MacNab) and Albie Littlewood (Jonathan Readwin).

Cast

Production
Writer John Sullivan had the idea for a prequel to the sitcom Only Fools and Horses in 1996; its commission was announced in 2003 and the premise for the series was established in the final Only Fools and Horses episode "Sleepless in Peckham" in 2003, where Rodney discovers a photograph of Freddie Robdal from 1960. His uncanny resemblance to Rodney confirmed that he, and not Reg, was Rodney's biological father. A lot of the groundwork for this had been both laid and explored in the Episode "The Frog's Legacy" the 1987 Christmas Day hour-long special. In the episode Rodney goes to ask about his father to which Albert diplomatically replies 'They're rumours Rodney. That's all. Rumours.' The proposed prequel, was to be titled Once Upon a Time in Peckham, it would see young versions of Del, Boycie, Denzil and Trigger, and Sullivan said "Joanie will be a key character, and during the film will give birth to Rodney." However, the prequel was shelved, and spin-off The Green Green Grass was developed to follow secondary characters, Boycie, Marlene and their son Tyler, as they escape the London Mafia and attempt to live in the Shropshire countryside. It was reported in January 2009 that the prequel was being considered again, following the success of The Green Green Grass.

On 3 July 2009, the BBC announced that the prequel had been commissioned as a 90-minute comedy drama, titled Sex, Drugs & Rock 'n' Chips, to be co-produced by the BBC and Sullivan's production company, Shazam Productions. Originally scheduled for August, filming began in October 2009 in London, lasting 19 days. Nicholas Lyndhurst, who played Rodney in Only Fools and Horses, would play villain and art connoisseur Freddie Robdal in a reprise of his role in the "Sleepless in Peckham" photograph, Kellie Bright (Bad Girls, The Archers) would play the "glamorous" Joan Trotter, her husband Reg would be portrayed by Shaun Dingwall (Soldier Soldier, Doctor Who), and his father by Phil Daniels (Quadrophenia, EastEnders). James Buckley (The Inbetweeners), would play the teenage Derek, Joan and Reg's son, portrayed by David Jason in Only Fools and Horses. Dewi Humphreys (The Green Green Grass) would direct. It was announced in January 2010 that the production would be shown on 24 January on BBC One with the title Rock & Chips.

The drama was produced by Gareth Gwenlan, who worked on Only Fools and Horses between 1988 and 2003. Speaking to the Western Mail, he described it as "essentially a love story" between Joan and Freddie, and he said that Lyndhurst "told me he thinks it's the best thing he's ever done". Speaking about the casting of Lyndhurst, he said he "would make a marvellous villain, which is something people will never have seen him do on TV before".

Speaking about continuing the story, Gwenlan said that the production was "run on the idea it'll be turned into a series. This one lays the groundwork and John [Sullivan] has enough for about two more series."

On 13 September 2010, while promoting the third series of The Inbetweeners on BBC Radio 5 Live, James Buckley confirmed that Rock & Chips would return for two more specials, one for Christmas 2010, and the other for Easter 2011. John Sullivan died on 23 April 2011, five days before the final episode was broadcast.

Locations
The 'Nags Head' pub used in the pilot episode is a de-furbished version of the existing 'Pelton Arms' pub in Greenwich, which maintains the 'Only Fools And Horses' look, style and 'feel'.  The prefabricated Excalibur Estate in Catford was used as a location in the opening episode.

John Sullivan's comments
Sullivan said when the production was announced that it would "give us a bit of an insight into why Del and Rodney turned out the way they did" in a period "before The Beatles and Mary Quant made London the coolest place on the planet" when "the staple diet was rock salmon and chips and the flicks offer the only hint of glamour". Expanding further on the basis for the prequel, he said:
... the most important person in the flat [in Only Fools and Horses] was never, ever seen; it was the spirit of Del's (and Rodney's) beloved mother Joan who had passed away 17 years before, and throughout the run of the series Del constantly referred to her and past events within the Trotter Family. ... But much of his historical information was at best contradictory, and  outright lies. We were left with a situation where the only person who really knew what had happened was an unreliable witness, so I decided to return to those misty days of 1960 to meet all those characters we'd only ever heard about ...

Nicholas Lyndhurst's comments
In an interview in the press pack for the production, Lyndhurst described Freddie Robdal as "a villain – charming, but nasty", and comparing him to Rodney, said that: "They're from two entirely different suitcases as far as I'm concerned. I didn't want to bring into it anything that I'd already done with Rodney and fortunately there wasn't any opportunity to do so. They're like chalk and cheese." Speaking about the 19-day filming schedule and the "not great" budget, he also told Michael Deacon of The Daily Telegraph that:

I was very pleased it was made at all. ... There were people who said, 'I don't think we're going to do this', and we had to wait months to get the green light. We thought, 'Well, we haven't got the budget we want, we haven't got the schedule we want, so we're going to have to make it as brilliant as we can.' It was a costume drama and it needed a costume drama budget, and it didn't get that.

Episodes

Reception
Overnight figures estimated Rock & Chips was seen by 7.4 million viewers with a 28% audience share, winning the slot against ITV's Wild at Heart and the Dancing on Ice results show. It was the second most-watched programme of the day, behind the first Dancing on Ice programme of the evening. Final figures showed it was seen by 8.42 million viewers on BBC One and 279,000 on BBC HD.

Sam Wollaston for The Guardian said he was missing the interplay between Rodney and Del Boy from the original, and that the only fun in the drama was "recognising the nods, working out who's who and how it all fits into place. Otherwise, it's pretty lame." The Daily Mirror's Jim Shelley didn't find the storyline "interesting or convincing", finding Lyndhurst's performance as Freddie "laughable" and saying it was "bizarre" that the storyline "virtually abandoned its main character (the young Del Boy) and its best actor (the engaging James Buckley from The Inbetweeners) who played him". In The Independent, Tom Sutcliffe said that "the narrative's focus was blurred and the pacing weirdly off – quite a lot of the time you were well ahead of the drama and hanging around for it to catch up with you". Benji Wilson from The Daily Telegraph also wasn't impressed saying the viewer would have been disappointed if they "tuned in wanting to be entertained, enthused, or anything in between", and that it was an "ocean-going stinker".

However, The Scotsman's Paul Whitelaw said that, despite a "disjointed" plot and it being "overstretched at 90 minutes": "It was actually pretty good. Not great, not perfect, but a watchable production from which everyone emerged with their dignity intact." He said that Buckley "delivered a charming performance in what was effectively a supporting role. Wisely choosing to suggest Del's familiar mannerisms without opting for outright impersonation, he carried off a difficult task with modest élan." Writing for The Stage, Harry Venning found the performances "top notch" and praised the script as "first class", saying "the comic moments were of the highest quality and beautifully crafted into the narrative". Andrew Billen from The Times described Bright's portrayal of Joan as "winsome", said Lyndhurst "produced a detailed performance" and that "Rock & Chips was better than the sequel that preceded it." Keith Watson in the Metro also praised the performances of Buckley and Bright, saying "They deserved a show all to themselves." Although he found the period detail "squeaky clean" and "unconvincing", he closed his review by saying: "Somehow it made me care about the Trotters in a way decades of Only Fools and Horses never came close to."

Home media
The pilot of Rock & Chips was released on Region 2 DVD on 5 April 2010. The Christmas special "Five Gold Rings" was released on DVD on 28 March 2011. On 2 May 2011, the third special "The Frog and the Pussycat", was released as well as a three-disc DVD set titled "Rock & Chips – The Complete Collection", comprising all three of the episodes.

References

External links

Fiction set in 1960
Fiction set in 1961
2010 British television series debuts
2011 British television series endings
2010s British comedy-drama television series
Adultery in television
BBC comedy-drama television shows
English-language television shows
 
Peckham
Prequel television series
Television series about brothers
Television series about dysfunctional families
Television series set in the 1960s
Television shows set in London
Television shows shot at BBC Elstree Centre